Joe Jonas (born 31 December 2000), is a South African rugby player. He plays fullback at the Biarritz Olympique.

Playing career
After receiving a scholarship to attend the Glenwood High School in Durban, Joe Jonas first played with the Natal Sharks, in 2020 he joined the Biarritz Olympique training centre. After competing in the Supersevens, he played his first Top 14 match against the Section Paloise in November 2021 and scored his first try in Clermont during his third start. In December 2021 he extended his contract until 2024.

References

2000 births
Living people
Rugby union fullbacks
Biarritz Olympique players
South African expatriate rugby union players
South African expatriate sportspeople in France
Expatriate rugby union players in France
Rugby union players from the Western Cape